The SECS-I (SEMI Equipment Communications Standard, Part 1), sometimes called SEMI E4, provide the syntactical details (like frame formats, etc.) for communication between a semiconductor manufacturing equipment and a host machine. SECS-I works on RS 232 based serial links and define how the communications are transmitted over RS-232C. HSMS (High Speed SECS Message Services) provides the corresponding specification for Ethernet-based networks.

Communications protocols